De Vlijt (English: The Diligence) is a smock mill in Meppel, Netherlands. It was built in 2001.

History

De Vlijt was built in 2001 on the base of a tower mill which had been taken out of use in 1933 and demolished in 1965. The tower had been built on an octagonal brick base which was left standing. The base is currently used as living accommodation and office space.

Description

De Vlijt is what the Dutch describe as an "achtkante stellingmolen". It is a smock mill with a stage. The mill is winded by tailpole and winch. The cast-iron windshaft was made by Fabrikaat Gieterij Hardinxveld in 2001. The mill has no internal gears or machinery.

Public Access
De Vlijt is not open to the public.

References

External links
De Vlijt website

Windmills in Drenthe
Smock mills in the Netherlands
Windmills completed in 2001
Octagonal buildings in the Netherlands
De Vlijt, Meppel